Methow, is an unincorporated community in Okanogan County, Washington, United States.  The community had a population of 262 at the 2000 census.

History
Methow was founded in 1889 by W.A. Bolinger when he moved his store from the former mining boom-town at Squaw Creek (approx. 4 miles south). It is named after the Methow people, an Interior Salish people who lived in the area. The name "Methow" itself comes from the Okanagan placename /mətxʷú/, meaning "sunflower (seeds)". The unincorporated community has its own community center, post office, fire station, church, water system, and two parks. The Methow Store, originally built by W.A. Bolinger, is no longer in business as of 2009, nor is the town's restaurant. The town is one of the principal starting points for rafting along the Methow River.

The original Methow Store can be seen just off Washington State Route 153. Directly across the street sits a large historic stone house and homestead that was built by the Bolinger family. This small town is also host to two old single room schoolhouses. One of these schoolhouses sits just north of the Methow Store, and most people recognize it as "the old log cabin". The other schoolhouse is now used as a community center. The Methow Church was formed over a century ago. Methow’s population has stayed consistent for the past several decades at about fifty people. The population of the surrounding area, the Methow Valley, has grown significantly over the past two decades.

Geography

Methow is located on the Methow River  upriver from the confluence of the Methow and Columbia rivers in Okanogan County, Washington. It sits at an elevation of 1,156 feet above sea level in the foothills of the Cascade Range.

Climate
This climatic region is typified by large seasonal temperature differences, with warm to hot (and often humid) summers and cold (sometimes severely cold) winters.  According to the Köppen Climate Classification system, Methow has a dry-summer humid continental climate, abbreviated "Dsb" on climate maps.

References

External links
Methow Mining Boom

Census-designated places in Washington (state)
Census-designated places in Okanogan County, Washington
Populated places established in 1889
Populated places in the Okanagan Country